Kerem Demirbay (born 3 July 1993) is a German professional footballer who plays as a midfielder for Bundesliga club Bayer Leverkusen. A former youth international for Turkey, Demirbay switched to represent Germany.

Early life and career
Demirbay was born in Herten, North Rhine-Westphalia. He began playing club football with FC Schalke 04 in 1999. After several years with the club, he continued his training with Borussia Dortmund and SG Wattenscheid 09.

Club career

Borussia Dortmund
After spending a year in their youth setup, Demirbay was promoted to Borussia Dortmund II playing in third tier 3. Liga. On 21 July 2012, the first matchday of the 2012–13 season, he came to his debut in professional football in an away game against VfL Osnabrück, replacing Konstantin Fring from the bench. He scored in the 1–2 home defeat against 1. FC Saarbrücken.

Hamburger SV
In the 2013–14 winter break, he agreed to join Hamburger SV on a free transfer in July 2014. After injury issues and several caps for their second team in fourth tier Regionalliga, he made his Bundesliga debut in the 1–3 home defeat by VfL Wolfsburg on 19 April 2014.

1. FC Kaiserslautern
Although performing well in 2014–15 pre-season games, he moved to 2. Bundesliga side 1. FC Kaiserslautern on a season long loan to in August 2014. There he became a first team regular, starting in 18 matches and being put in another four times.

Fortuna Düsseldorf

Returning to Hamburg, he again played pre-season, before signing on a season long loan to Fortuna Düsseldorf on 25 August 2015.

1899 Hoffenheim
In June 2016, Demirbay signed for 1899 Hoffenheim and was handed the number 10 shirt. In April 2016, Demirbay scored the all important equalising goal against 1. FC Köln that earned the club from Sinsheim their first ever European qualification.

Bayer Leverkusen
On 9 May 2019, Bayer Leverkusen announced that Demirbay would end his stint at Hoffenheim, and would move to the BayArena at the start of the summer transfer window in a five-year deal until 30 June 2024. Leverkusen reportedly triggered a release clause in Demirbay's Hoffenheim contract by paying a €32 million or €28 million fee, depending on the source.

International career

Youth
Although not having a Turkish passport, Demirbay played international youth football for the Turkish Football Association. In March 2015, he was chosen by Germany U21 coach Horst Hrubesch, but was excluded from games due to injury. He was then selected for 2015 UEFA European Under-21 Championship in the Czech Republic, but did not play in any of the games.

Senior

Demirbay accepted a callup to the Turkey national football team on 17 May 2017, for a  2018 FIFA World Cup qualification against Kosovo, but rescinded the offer. Later in the same day, Demirbay accepted a callup to the Germany national team for the friendly against Denmark on 6 June 2017, for the 2018 World Cup qualification match against San Marino on 10 June 2017 and for the 2017 Confederations Cup to be held from 17 June to 2 July 2017.

Demirbay made his international debut on 6 June against Denmark, where he was subbed on in the 77th minute for Leon Goretzka.

Controversial on-field comments
Demirbay achieved international notoriety for making a sexist comment against female referee Bibiana Steinhaus, in violation of league rules. After being sent off by Steinhaus, he told her "women have no place in men's football". Demirbay telephoned Steinhaus after the match to apologise. As a sanction for his behaviour, he was given a five-game ban and was made to referee a junior league girls' football match.

Career statistics

International

As of match played 25 June 2017. Germany score listed first, score column indicates score after each Demirbay goal.

Honours
Germany
FIFA Confederations Cup: 2017

References

External links

Kicker profile

1993 births
Living people
People from Herten
Sportspeople from Münster (region)
Footballers from North Rhine-Westphalia
German footballers
Germany international footballers
Turkish footballers
Turkey youth international footballers
Turkey under-21 international footballers
Association football midfielders
Borussia Dortmund II players
Hamburger SV players
Hamburger SV II players
1. FC Kaiserslautern players
Fortuna Düsseldorf players
TSG 1899 Hoffenheim players
Bayer 04 Leverkusen players
3. Liga players
2. Bundesliga players
Bundesliga players
2017 FIFA Confederations Cup players
FIFA Confederations Cup-winning players
German people of Turkish descent